Casa de Balboa is a building in San Diego's Balboa Park, in the U.S. state of California. The building was originally known as the Commerce and Industries Building, and later called the Canadian Building, the Palace of Better Housing, and the Electric Building. It is currently home to the Museum of Photographic Arts, the San Diego History Center, the San Diego Model Railroad Museum, and the Balboa Art Conservation Center.

References

External links
 

Balboa Park (San Diego)
Buildings and structures in San Diego